The Punk Group is an electro/synth-rock band originating from Portland, Oregon.

Background
The group began in 2002 "as a joke" and consists of two male members, Brian Applegate and Tony Cameron, who dub themselves "The Model" and "Sex Object" after song titles by the German electronic band Kraftwerk. All the band's albums are self-released. Critics cite the band's 1980s musical influences, particularly Devo.

Style
The Punk Group frequently criticize pop culture and other artists in their songs and are known for their politically incorrect lyrics.  "We like to put people in their place and knock them down a few pegs, you know, make sure they don't get too big for their britches", said one member. Their live shows consists of the two men who sing and play guitar, bass or synthesizer, and are known to wear assorted costumes, augmented by a drum machine.

Touring
Although the band rarely played outside of Portland, they did embark on a European tour in the summer of 2007 and Australia in 2008. The Punk Group played their final Portland show at Dante's in May 2010 before relocating to San Francisco and Seattle, respectively. In 2012, they opened for Devo on numerous dates in California and performed an unofficial reunion at Dante's in August 2018.

Discography
International Rock Stars (2003)
Tour De Force (2003)
Video Games (2005)
Rock Off and Fuck On (2005)
The Basement Tapes Vol. 1 (2006)
The Basement Tapes Vol. 2 (2006)
Make a Rainbow With Your Hands (2007)
Sex, Drum Machines & Rock 'n Roll (2008)
Self Titled (2009)
Difficult Listening (2010)
Pink Foam (2010)
Fruition (2015)

Tribute album
Shower Time! A Tribute to the Punk Group (2009)

DVD
The Punk Group from Outer Space (2007)

Equipment
 Allen & Heath ZED 428 mixing console
 Behringer B-2 condenser microphone
 Boss VT-1 vocal transformer
 Boss DR-5 drum machine
 Boss DR-880 drum machine
 Boss ME-80 guitar effects 
 DBX DDP rack mount digital dynamic processor
 Elektron Machinedrum drum machine
 Fender 4 string electric guitar
 Fender bass guitar
 Korg Kaossilator
 Korg MS2000 synthesizer
 Lexicon effects processor
 Line 6 pods
 Logic
 Moog Voyager synthesizer
 Moog Sub Phatty synthesizer
 Moog minimoog model D reissue
 Moog Mother 32
 Moog DFAM
 Moog Grandmother synthesizer
 Nord G-2 synthesizer
 Omnichord
 Pro Tools
 RAT distortion pedal
 Reason
 Roland Jupiter 6 synthesizer
 Roland Juno 60 synthesizer
 Roland U-20 keyboard
 Roland TR-08 (808 reissue) drum machine
 Roland VT-3 voice transformer
 Shure SM-57 microphones

External links
  The Punk Group on Facebook

References

American new wave musical groups
Punk rock groups from Oregon
Musical groups from Portland, Oregon
American comedy musical groups
2002 establishments in Oregon
Musical groups established in 2002